Sphodromantis rudolfae is a species of praying mantis found in East Africa (Ethiopia, Kenya, Somalia, and Zanzibar).

See also
African mantis
List of mantis genera and species

References

rudolfae
Mantodea of Africa
Insects described in 1901